Harry C. "Hank" Payne (1947-January 8, 2008) was the 17th president of Hamilton College, the 14th president of Williams College, and later president of Woodward Academy.  Born in Worcester, Massachusetts, he earned academic degrees in history from Yale University, and taught at Colgate University before becoming provost of Haverford College and then president of two liberal arts colleges.  He is known for disputing the story that Zephaniah Swift Moore - in his attempt to move the campus of Williams College closer to Boston - pilfered its library.

References

Colgate University faculty
Williams College faculty
Presidents of Williams College
Year of birth uncertain
2008 deaths